Dion Enrique Valle Robbins (born 22 July 1977 in Darwin, Australia) is a Chilean-Australian former footballer who played as a central defender.

Club career
He played in the Chilean Primera División for Colo-Colo in 1995. In January 1997, he became the first player signed by the newly formed United States A-League club Jacksonville Cyclones. He captained the club for the first quarter of the 1997 season before being released in May 1997. Back in Australia, along with Perth Glory he got two titles of the National Soccer League.

International career
He was a member of Chile's squads for the finals of the 1993 FIFA U-17 World Championship and the 1995 FIFA World Youth Championship. In addition, he took part of Chile squad in both the 1993 South American U17 Championship and the 1995 South American U20 Championship.

Personal life
Born to a Chilean father and an Australian mother, Valle came to Chile in 1991 at the age of 13 along with his brother, who dreamed of becoming a professional footballer.

At the same time he was a footballer, he got a degree in Building Construction in Sydney.

Honours

Club
Colo-Colo
 Chilean Primera División (1): 1993

Perth Glory
 National Soccer League (2): 1999–2000, 2001–02

International
Chile U17
 FIFA U-17 World Cup Third place: 1993

References

External links
 Dion Valle at playmakerstats.com (English version of ceroacero.es)
 Oz Football Stats

1977 births
Living people
Sportspeople from Darwin, Northern Territory
Australian people of Chilean descent
Sportspeople of Chilean descent
Australian soccer players
Naturalized citizens of Chile
Chilean footballers
Chile youth international footballers
Chile under-20 international footballers
Colo-Colo footballers
Jacksonville Cyclones players
Macarthur Rams FC players
Perth Glory FC players
Blacktown City FC players
Marconi Stallions FC players
Chilean Primera División players
A-League (1995–2004) players
National Soccer League (Australia) players
Australian expatriate soccer players
Chilean expatriate footballers
Australian expatriate sportspeople in Chile
Australian expatriate sportspeople in the United States
Chilean expatriate sportspeople in the United States
Chilean expatriate sportspeople in Australia
Expatriate soccer players in the United States
Expatriate soccer players in Australia
Association football defenders
Citizens of Chile through descent